Frederick William George Adolphus, Landgrave of Hesse (26 November 1820 – 14 October 1884) was the only son of Wilhelm I, Landgrave of Hesse-Kassel-Rumpenheim and Princess Louise Charlotte of Denmark.

Early life and marriages

Prince Frederick William of Hesse-Kassel was born in Copenhagen on 26 November 1820. He moved to Denmark with his family at the age of three, and grew up there. He attended the university in Bonn, and then began a military career. In 1843 he was third in line for the Danish throne after the King's son and brother, Prince Ferdinand.
His siblings included Louise of Hesse-Kassel, future Queen of Denmark, Princess Marie Luise Charlotte of Hesse-Kassel and Princess Auguste Sophie Friederike of Hesse-Kassel.

On 28 January 1844, Frederick married Grand Duchess Alexandra Nikolaevna of Russia at St Petersburg. Frederick had come to St Petersburg as a prospective bridegroom for her sister Olga, but fell in love with Alexandra instead on the first evening he spent with the family. Although Olga was the elder daughter and also found Frederick to be an engaging young man, she stepped aside in favour of her sister, and even chaperoned the couple when they wanted to spend time together. The emperor and empress then gave their permission for Alexandra and Frederick to be married.

Alexandra became acutely ill with tuberculosis shortly before her wedding, and this complicated the pregnancy which soon followed. She was never well enough to travel to Hesse and take up her new position with her husband. They stayed in St. Petersburg, where her health rapidly declined. She went into labor prematurely, three months before the child was due, and gave birth to a son, Wilhelm. The infant died shortly after he was born, and Alexandra died later the same day. Her parents were devastated and their grief would last until the end of their lives. She was buried at the Peter and Paul Fortress in St. Petersburg. The son was buried in Rumpenheim, now a borough of Offenbach am Main, Germany.

In 1849 Frederick William joined HMS Cleopatra to train as a midshipman. The Cleopatra  was reassigned to Singapore to take the place of HMS Maeander. She arrived in Singapore from Devonport via Rio de Janeiro under Captain Massie on 14 September 1849 and left with HMS Reynard for Labuan and China on 10 October. The Singapore paper mistakenly described the Prince as the son of the Danish king but the king had no sons, he was an heir to the throne.

On 26 May 1853, Frederick married Alexandra's first cousin, Princess Anna of Prussia (1836–1918), at Charlottenburg Palace in Berlin. Although they had six children together, Frederick and Anna were never emotionally close, and it is speculated that one reason was because Fritz was unable to overcome his grief for his first wife. The couple first lived in Denmark in Dehn Mansion, a mansion Prince Frederick had bought in 1844.

Children
His first wife was Alexandra Nikolaevna of Russia (1825–1844), daughter of Emperor Nicholas I of Russia and Charlotte of Prussia. Alexandra died in childbirth, delivering a son who was born three months prematurely, and who died on the day of his birth:
 Prince Wilhelm (1844–1844)

His second wife was Princess Anna of Prussia (1836–1918), the youngest daughter of Prince Charles of Prussia and Princess Marie of Saxe-Weimar-Eisenach. They had six children:
 Prince Frederick William III of Hesse (1854–1888); never married; died at sea on a voyage from Batavia to Singapore.
 Princess Elisabeth Alexandra Charlotte of Hesse (1861–1955); married Leopold, Hereditary Prince of Anhalt in June 1884 and had issue.
 Prince Alexander Frederick of Hesse (1863–1945); married Baroness Gisela Stockhorner von Starheim.
 Prince Frederick Charles of Hesse, King of Finland (1868–1940); married Princess Margaret of Prussia and had issue.
 Princess Marie-Polyxene of Hesse (1872–1882).
 Princess Sybille Margaret Adelheid Louise of Hesse (1877–1925); married Friedrich Alexander Henry Robert Carl Albert, Baron von Vincke (divorced 1923).

Elector of Hesse
He is important dynastically as a candidate for both the headship of the Hesse-Kassel dynasty (through his father) and for the Danish throne (through his mother). When Frederick William, deposed Elector of Hesse died in 1875, his sons were excluded from succession, because of his morganatic marriage. Therefore, Prince Frederick William succeeded the latter as titular Elector of Hesse.

Frederick William died on 14 October 1884 at Hamburg.

Honours and awards
Friedrich Wilhelm received the following awards:
German decorations

Foreign decorations
 : Grand Cross of the Royal Hungarian Order of St. Stephen, 1860
 :
 Knight of the Elephant, 28 June 1840
 Cross of Honour of the Order of the Dannebrog, 28 June 1840
  Kingdom of Greece: Grand Cross of the Redeemer
 :
 Knight of St. Andrew, in Diamonds, 1 July 1843
 Knight of St. Alexander Nevsky
 Knight of the White Eagle
 Knight of St. Anna, 1st Class
 Knight of St. George, 4th Class, 1878
   Sweden-Norway: Knight of the Seraphim, 2 November 1869

Ancestry

References

Citations

Bibliography

External links

|-

1820 births
1884 deaths
Frederick William
Grand Crosses of the Order of Saint Stephen of Hungary
Recipients of the Order of St. George of the Fourth Degree
Recipients of the Cross of Honour of the Order of the Dannebrog